is a Japanese manga series by Sagan Sagan. It has been serialized in the  manga magazine ihr Hertz since January 31, 2019. A live-action television drama adaptation was broadcast from June 13, 2022, to July 4, 2022.

Plot

Old-Fashioned Cupcake

Soon to be approaching his 40s, 39-year-old Nozue feels his life is at a standstill, and because of his age, he feels he is at a point where he cannot take risks and change his life. As such, he continues to decline promotions at his job and romantic advances from other women. In an attempt to inspire him to move forward, Nozue's 29-year-old subordinate, Togawa, begins taking him to restaurants frequented by women, giving him new first-time experiences at his age. As the two spend more time together on what Togawa has called their "anti-aging experiment", Nozue becomes closer to Togawa while wondering why he is insistent on making him happy. Nozue grows fond of him, but he becomes unsure due to their gender, difference in age, and social standing. One day, Togawa confesses to Nozue that he has loved him ever since he inspired him to have a positive outlook towards life during his job interview. After reflecting, Nozue comes to accept his feelings for Togawa and the two become a couple.

Old-Fashioned Cupcake with Cappucino

As Nozue and Togawa continue their relationship, Nozue realizes he is afraid of criticism from their peers. After Kakitani, Nozue's friend and co-worker, nearly figures out their relationship, Nozue suggests to Togawa that they put some distance between each other, causing Togawa to become upset. After spending some time apart, Nozue confesses to Kakitani and Kirishima about his relationship with Togawa. Kirishima has Togawa bring Nozue home, allowing them to make up. At the same time, Togawa announces that he is transferring jobs so that he can grow in his career and eventually be on equal standing with Nozue. A few days later, Kirishima encourages Nozue to pursue what is important to him, and Nozue accepts the new changes in his relationships.

Characters

; 
Nozue is a 39-year-old man with a "healing" personality who is approaching his 40s.

; 
Togawa is a 29-year-old man who works as a subordinate under Nozue.

Media

Manga

Old-Fashioned Cupcake is written and illustrated by Sagan Sagan. It was serialized in the  manga magazine ihr Hertz from the March 2019 issue released on January 31, 2019 to the March 2020 issue released on January 31, 2020. It was followed up with a sequel titled Old-Fashioned Cupcake with Cappucino, which ran from the July 2020 issue released on May 29, 2020 to the May 2021 issue released on March 31, 2021. A short story titled Old-Fashioned Cupcake with Karaage was serialized in the January 2022 issue released on November 30, 2021. A third series titled Old-Fashioned Cupcake with My Picnic was serialized beginning with the March 2022 issue released on January 31, 2022. The chapters were later released in two bound volumes by Taiyoh Tosho under the H & C Comics ihr Hertz Series imprint.

On August 1, 2022, Viz Media announced that they had licensed the series for North American distribution in English under their SuBLime imprint.

Drama CD

Two audio dramas were released by Fifth Avenue on CD, starring Kazuyuki Okitsu as Nozue and Yōhei Azakami as Tagawa. The drama CD adaptation of Old-Fashioned Cupcake was released on August 2, 2020. The drama CD adaptation of Old-Fashioned Cupcake with Cappucino was released on December 22, 2021.

Television drama

A live-action television drama adaptation of Old-Fashioned Cupcake was announced on May 23, 2022. The drama series was broadcast on Fuji TV on Mondays at 12 AM beginning on June 13, 2022. Simultaneously, it was also distributed through Fuji TV's video streaming service, Fuji TV On Demand (FOD), and Rakuten TV, with the first two episodes releasing on the same day. It was later re-broadcast on Fuji TV on Wednesdays at 12:25 AM beginning on August 17, 2022.

The drama series is directed by Ayaka Katō. The show's theme song is "Blue Blur" (feat. Mabanua) by Ryu Matsuyama. A collaboration music video for the song was released on YouTube featuring footage from Old-Fashioned Cupcake. Behind-the-scenes footage of each episode were also released on Fuji TV On Demand and Rakuten TV, with the short version released beginning on June 20, 2022, and the long version on July 4, 2022.

The drama series was given a home release on Blu-ray and DVD on September 28, 2022. The home release included extras such as a photo booklet, bloopers, and behind-the-scenes footage, as well as a short epilogue drama titled "#ApplePie."

Takeda stated that he was interested in the drama project after his Kamen Rider Build co-stars, Atsuhiro Inukai and Eiji Akaso, had starred in boys' love television dramas (A Man Who Defies the World of BL and Cherry Magic! Thirty Years of Virginity Can Make You a Wizard?! respectively) as well. Kimura prepared for his role by doing muscle training at a gym, and he also stated that, during filming, he had to eat pancakes and drink coffee while talking for eight hours, even on a full stomach.

Reception

In 2020, Old-Fashioned Cupcake ranked in second place in the comics category of Kono BL ga Yabai! It also ranked in first place for Best Comic in the Chil-Chil BL Awards for 2021. In July 2022, the series sold a cumulative total of at least 500,000 physical copies in Japan. The television drama reached no. 1 on Fuji TV On Demand's daily rankings and was ranked no. 1 in popularity for two weeks on Rakuten TV.

Notes

References

External links 

  

2019 manga
2022 Japanese television series debuts
2010s LGBT literature
2020s Japanese LGBT-related television series
Fuji TV dramas
Japanese boys' love television series
Japanese television dramas based on manga
Josei manga
SuBLime manga
Yaoi anime and manga